Attorney General Duffy may refer to:

Herbert S. Duffy (1900–1956), Attorney General of Ohio
John Gavan Duffy (1844–1917), Attorney-General of the Colony of Victoria
Michael Duffy (Australian politician) (born 1938), Attorney-General of Australia